Ambición (English title: Ambition) is a Mexican telenovela produced by Valentín Pimstein for Televisa in 1980.

Cast 
Julieta Bracho
Rafael Baledón
Edith González as Charito
Raymundo Capetillo
Leonardo Daniel
Gregorio Casals
Erika Buenfil
Beatriz Aguirre
Ada Carrasco

References

External links 

Mexican telenovelas
1980 telenovelas
Televisa telenovelas
Spanish-language telenovelas
1980 Mexican television series debuts
1980 Mexican television series endings